The Philippine Commission was the name of two bodies, both appointed by the president of the United States, to assist with governing the Philippines.

The first Philippine Commission, also known as the Schurman Commission, was appointed by President William McKinley on January 20, 1899 as a recommendatory body.

The second Philippine Commission, also known as the Taft Commission, was a body appointed by the president to exercise legislative and limited executive powers in the Philippines. It was first appointed by President McKinley in 1900 under his executive authority. The Philippine Organic Act was passed by the United States Congress in 1902; this enshrined into law the commission's legislative and executive authority. As stipulated in the Philippine Organic Act, the bicameral Philippine Legislature was established in 1907, with the commission as the upper house and the elected Philippine Assembly acting as lower house. The Jones Act of 1916 ended the commission, replacing it with an elected Philippine Senate as the legislature's upper house.

First Philippine Commission

On January 20, 1899, President McKinley appointed the First Philippine Commission (the Schurman Commission), a five-person group headed by Dr. Jacob Schurman, president of Cornell University, to investigate conditions in the islands and make recommendations. In the report that they issued to the president the following year, the commissioners acknowledged Filipino aspirations for independence; they declared, however, that the Philippines was not ready for it. Specific recommendations included the establishment of civilian government as rapidly as possible (the American chief executive in the islands at that time was the military governor), including establishment of a bicameral legislature, autonomous governments on the provincial and municipal levels, and a system of free public elementary schools.

Second Philippine Commission

From Philippines: A Country Study by Ronald E. Dolan:

The Second Philippine Commission (the Taft Commission), appointed by McKinley on March 16, 1900, and headed by William Howard Taft, was granted legislative as well as limited executive powers. Between September 1900 and August 1902, it issued 499 laws. A judicial system was established, including a Supreme Court, and a legal code was drawn up to replace antiquated Spanish ordinances. A civil service was organized. The 1901 municipal code provided for popularly elected presidents, vice presidents, and councilors to serve on municipal boards. The municipal board members were responsible for collecting taxes, maintaining municipal properties, and undertaking necessary construction projects; they also elected provincial governors." On July 4, 1901, Taft became governor of a civil administration for the Philippines. This regime, called the Insular Government, administered the country until 1935.

"The Philippine Organic Act of July 1902 stipulated that... a Philippine Legislature would be established composed of a lower house, the Philippine Assembly, which would be popularly elected, and an upper house consisting of the Philippine Commission. The two houses would share legislative powers, although the upper house alone would pass laws relating to the Moros and other non-Christian peoples. The act also provided for extending the United States Bill of Rights to Filipinos and sending two Filipino resident commissioners to Washington to attend sessions of the United States Congress. In July 1907, the first elections for the assembly were held, and it opened its first session on October 16, 1907."

Membership

Leaders
The body was led by the governor-general of the Philippines:
William Howard Taft (1901–1904)
Luke Edward Wright (1904–1905)
Henry Clay Ide (1905–1906)
James Francis Smith (1906–1909)
William Cameron Forbes (1909–1913)
Francis Burton Harrison (1913–1916)

Other members
Secretary of finance and justice:

Secretary of the Interior:

Secretary of commerce and police:

Secretary of public instruction:

Philippine members (1901–1909):

Philippine members (1909–1913):

See also
Congress of the Philippines

References and notes

Bibliography

Further reading

External links

 
  NB: very little material (if any) actually online
 NB: very little material (if any) actually online

 
Historical legislatures in the Philippines
Defunct upper houses
United States national commissions
Legislatures of dependent territories